The 2018 season was the Carolina Panthers' 24th in the National Football League (NFL) and their eighth under head coach Ron Rivera. It was the team's first season without former assistant head coach/defensive coordinator Steve Wilks, who became head coach of the Arizona Cardinals in the offseason and former offensive coordinator Mike Shula, who became the quarterbacks coach and offensive coordinator of the New York Giants. 

The Panthers entered the season hoping to improve or match their 11–5 record from last year. After starting 6–2, the Panthers suffered a late-season collapse, going on a 7-game losing streak, failing to improve or match their previous season's record, and were eliminated from playoff contention following a loss to the Atlanta Falcons in Week 16. Although they went a dismal 1–7 in the second half of the season, the Panthers managed to end on a high note by defeating their division rival New Orleans Saints, 33–14.

Draft

Draft trades
 The Panthers traded wide receiver Kelvin Benjamin to Buffalo in exchange for Buffalo's third-round selection (85th overall) and the seventh-round selection they acquired from the LA Chargers (234th overall).
 The Panthers traded their fourth-round selection (123rd overall) and punter Kasey Redfern to Cleveland in exchange for Cleveland's seventh-round selection in 2017 and punter Andy Lee.

Staff

Final roster

Preseason

Regular season

Schedule

Note: Intra-division opponents are in bold text.

Game summaries

Week 1: vs. Dallas Cowboys

In the Panthers' home opener both teams were scoreless in the first quarter. In the second, Cam Newton rushed for a touchdown to score the  game's first points. Graham Gano later kicked a field goal to further the Panthers' lead to 10–0. Both teams were again scoreless in the third quarter. Alexander Armah scored a touchdown in the fourth quarter, but the extra point attempt was no good when the ball slipped out of Michael Palardy's hands. The Cowboys later put points on the board with an Ezekiel Elliott touchdown run followed by a two-point conversion by quarterback Dak Prescott, decreasing the Panthers' lead to eight points. The Panthers managed to hold off the Cowboys by forcing a fumble off Prescott in the Cowboys' last offensive drive, winning 16–8.

Tight end Greg Olsen and offensive tackle Daryl Williams left the game early due to injuries.

Week 2: at Atlanta Falcons

The Falcons proved too much for the Panthers. With the 24–31 loss, the Panthers fell to 1–1.

Week 3: vs. Cincinnati Bengals

The Bengals were the first to score in the game but the Panthers answered back with a Cam Newton touchdown. Late in the first quarter Andy Dalton threw a pass intended for John Ross but it was intercepted by Donte Jackson. Early in the second Devin Funchess scored a touchdown with a Graham Gano field goal, and Carolina took the lead. Dalton was sacked by Efe Obada and fumbled the ball. Carolina recovered but the call was reversed and the Bengals soon tied the game at 14. Carolina took back the lead with a C. J. Anderson touchdown. In the third Dalton was picked off again, this time by Obada. Cincinnati soon followed a Newton TD with a touchdown of their own, moving to within seven. With less than four minutes to go, Jackson intercepted a Dalton pass intended for Ross. Gano then kicked a field goal making the score 31–21. Dalton's Hail Mary attempt, intended for Tyler Eifert, was picked off by Luke Kuechly. The Panthers won and improved to 2–1.

Week 5: vs. New York Giants

The Panthers came back after their bye week and took on the New York Giants at home. Carolina went into the third quarter with a 20–13 lead. New York scored a field goal in the third quarter, decreasing the Panthers' lead to four. In the fourth quarter, the Giants scored a touchdown with a two point conversion, followed by a Carolina field goal. With 1:15 to go in the game, the Giants scored on a Saquon Barkley touchdown catch, giving New York their first lead since the first quarter. The Panthers, down 31-30, only had a little more than a minute to try to win. They were able to get in field goal position. With six seconds to go, Graham Gano's 63 yard field goal was good. It was the longest successful field goal in franchise history and Gano became one of only six players to make a kick from 63 yards or longer. The Panthers won 33–31, improving to 3–1.

Week 6: at Washington Redskins

Things didn't start off well for the Panthers. Rookie D.J. Moore fumbled on a punt return and Washington recovered. This put the Redskins at a perfect spot to score and they did so. The Panthers had multiple turnovers in the first quarter, giving the Redskins a 14–0 lead by the end of one. The Panthers were able to catch up to the Redskins and had a chance to take the lead late in the fourth quarter. However, on fourth down and 5 at the Redskins 16, Cam Newton's pass for Jarius Wright fell incomplete. With the close loss of 17–23, the Panthers fell to 3–2.
This game saw the return of both Greg Olsen, who had been out with a foot injury since week one, and Thomas Davis, who was suspended for the first four games of the season.

Week 7: at Philadelphia Eagles

The Panthers were down 17-0 going into the fourth quarter with a seemingly lifeless offense. However, the team scored 21 points in the 4th quarter and beat the shell-shocked Eagles 21–17, improving to 4–2. They sealed the victory after preventing a 4th down conversion by the Eagles in the closing seconds of the 4th quarter. It was the largest 4th quarter comeback win in team history, and the largest comeback in franchise history.

Week 8: vs. Baltimore Ravens

Carolina and Baltimore went into the second quarter tied at seven. In the beginning of the second, Kyle Love tipped the ball out of QB Joe Flacco's hands, and the ball was recovered by Luke Kuechly. Greg Olsen scored a touchdown for the Panthers. Towards the end of the second, Cam Newton threw the ball into the end zone. Baltimore tipped it but Christian McCaffrey was able to catch it and score. With two seconds to go in the half, Graham Gano kicked a field goal, giving Carolina a 24–7 lead. In the third, Gano kicked another field goal. Alex Collins scored a touchdown for the Ravens making it a 27–14 Panthers lead. Newton scored a touchdown in the fourth but a two point conversion attempt was no good. Gano later made another field goal. The Panthers won 36–21 and improved to 5–2.

Week 9: vs. Tampa Bay Buccaneers

The Panthers went into half time up 35–14. In the third quarter Tampa Bay scored a touchdown making the score 35–21. Carolina and Tampa Bay both scored a touchdown in the fourth. The Panthers won 42–28, and improved to 6–2.

Week 10: at Pittsburgh Steelers

In this Thursday night game, the Steelers were too much for the Panthers, as the Steelers' defense sacked Cam Newton five times and returned an interception for a touchdown, while their offense scored on seven of their eight drives under Ben Roethlisberger, who threw for five touchdowns and recorded a perfect passer rating, culminating in a 21–52 loss.

With the crushing loss, the Panthers' three game winning streak was snapped, and they fell to 6–3.

Week 11: at Detroit Lions

Carolina had a chance to win at the end of the game with a two-point conversion attempt. However, Newton's pass intended for Wright fell incomplete. With the loss, the Panthers fall to 6-4.

Week 12: vs. Seattle Seahawks

In a tight contest the Panthers were unable to put away the Seahawks, and lost 27–30. They fell to 6–5.

Week 13: at Tampa Bay Buccaneers

The Panthers, thanks in part to Newton's four interceptions, fell to 6-6. The day after the game, the Panthers announced defensive line coach Brady Hoke and assistant secondary/cornerbacks coach Jeff Imamura had been fired. Ron Rivera would also take over defensive play calling duties, although Washington would retain the title of defensive coordinator.

Week 14: at Cleveland Browns

With the loss, Carolina fell to 6-7.

Week 15: vs. New Orleans Saints

The Panthers came into Monday night facing the NFC South champion and playoff-bound Saints. Carolina's defense stifled Drew Brees and the Saints offense for most of the game, forcing three turnovers. Cornerback Donte Jackson had a pick-two on a two-point conversion attempt and fellow corner James Bradberry had an interception. However, the Panthers offense stalled on several drives, including their final one. With the loss, the team's record fell to 6-8.

Week 16: vs. Atlanta Falcons

During the week, the Panthers decided to give backup QB Taylor Heinicke his first NFL start due to Newton's injured shoulder. The Panthers lost 24-10, extending their losing streak to 7 games. Their record stood at 6-9.

Week 17: at New Orleans Saints

This was the Panthers' only game outside of the Eastern Time Zone during the  season. Kyle Allen made his first start at QB due to injuries. Behind Allen, the Panthers won 33-14. With the win, the Panthers finished the season 7-9 and snapped their 7 game losing streak.

Standings

Division

Conference

References

External links
 

Carolina
Carolina Panthers seasons
Carolina Panthers